Krisztián Németh (born 5 April 1975) is a Slovak former footballer, who last managed FC DAC 1904 Dunajská Streda.

External links
 FC DAC 1904 profile
 Futbalove ligy profile
 at imscouting.com

References

1975 births
Living people
Hungarians in Slovakia
Sportspeople from Dunajská Streda
Slovak footballers
Association football midfielders
FC DAC 1904 Dunajská Streda players
FC Senec players
MŠK Rimavská Sobota players
FC Tatabánya players
MŠK Púchov players
Slovak Super Liga players
Slovakia international footballers
Slovak expatriate footballers
Slovak expatriate sportspeople in Hungary
Expatriate footballers in Hungary
Slovak football managers
FC DAC 1904 Dunajská Streda managers
Slovak Super Liga managers